Roberto Francisco Platero Ibáñez (born 31 December 1986) is a Spanish footballer who plays for AD Siete Villas as a forward.

Football career
Platero was born in Santoña, Cantabria. A product of Racing de Santander's youth system, he spent several years mainly registered with their reserves, only appearing once with the first team: on 17 June 2007, in the season's closing round, he played 20 minutes in a 0–2 La Liga home loss against Real Betis.

Purchased by CD Numancia in the summer of 2008, Platero went on to serve two loans in his first two years, at SD Ponferradina (six months) and Barakaldo CF, with both clubs in the third division. He competed solely in the lower leagues until his retirement.

References

External links

1986 births
Living people
People from Santoña
Spanish footballers
Footballers from Cantabria
Association football forwards
La Liga players
Segunda División B players
Tercera División players
Rayo Cantabria players
Racing de Santander players
CD Numancia players
SD Ponferradina players
Barakaldo CF footballers
Polideportivo Ejido footballers
Gimnástica de Torrelavega footballers
Deportivo Rayo Cantabria players